Clayton-le-Woods (Commonly shortened to Clayton) is a large village and civil parish of the Borough of Chorley, in Lancashire, England. According to the census of 2001, it has a population of 14,528. At the 2011 census the population of Cuerden civil parish was included within Clayton-le-Woods, giving a total of 14,532.

History
South-west of the village at Bluebell Woods, on the northern side of Bryning Brook is the site of Clayton Hall. The now-demolished 17th-century building was on a moated site thought to date from the medieval period. The waterfilled moat survives best at its north and north-east sides and access was by a causeway at the north-west corner. To the north and west are two fishponds connected to the moat. The area is protected by scheduled monument status.

The Roman Catholic St. Bede's Church opened on Preston Road in 1824. Designed by Thomas Burgess in sandstone with a slate roof, its layout is a single cell with three round-headed windows on the sides. A copper bell turret with a spirelet was added in 1964.

Geography
Situated to the north of the town of Chorley, Clayton-le-Woods is only a few miles from the city of Preston and adjacent to the large villages of Leyland and Bamber Bridge. The villages of Clayton Brook, Whittle-le-Woods, Brindle and Buckshaw Village are also located next to Clayton-le-Woods.

The village is divided in two by Cuerden Valley Park and the River Lostock, the western part bordering Leyland and the eastern bordering Whittle-le-Woods. The village is close to different junctions of the motorway network, junctions 28 & 29 of the M6, junction 8 & 9 of the M61, and junction 1A, 1 and 2 of the M65. There is also a smaller area called Wood End, West of the village, close to Leyland. It was built between the 1960s and 1980s.

Community
The village has six primary schools in its vicinity. The primary schools are, Clayton-le-Woods CE, Lancaster Lane, Westwood, Clayton Brook, Manor Road and St Bede's RC. A library was built in the village in 1985, located in Clayton Green next to Cuerden Valley Park.

There are a number of pubs, a large supermarket (Asda), a sports centre and two hotels all located within the village. The village is split into five areas; Cloverfield, Wood End / Clayton Green, Leylandside (the area of Clayton beside Leyland), and Cuerden. Charcoal burning is still being carried out by coppicing the woods, in the grounds of nearby Cuerden Hall.

There are also linen hand weavers' cottages which are located on Sheep Hill Lane.

Transport
Clayton-le-Woods has four local bus services operated by Stagecoach in Chorley and Preston Bus respectively. The 125 Stagecoach Gold route, connects Clayton-le-Woods to Chorley, Preston and Bolton. The 109 is operated by Stagecoach Merseyside & South Lancashire, and connects the village to nearby Leyland, Preston and Chorley.

Cycling Route 55 connects Clayton-le-Woods with Buckshaw Village and Euxton via Cuerden Valley Park.

Preston Bus, the service 114 is operated by Preston Bus, and connects the village with Chorley, Whittle-le-Woods and Leyland.

Road networks
The village lies along the A6 known locally as Preston Road, as well as this, Clayton-le-Woods is connected by the B5256 between Blackburn and Leyland, the B5254 between Clayton and Leyland, the M6 at Junction 28 and 29, the M61 at Junction 8 and 9 and the M65 at Junction 1A, 1 and 2. Further roads, such as the A49, connect Clayton to Buckshaw Village, Euxton, Charnock Richard and Wigan.

Notable people 
 Surrealist painter Leonora Carrington OBE (19172011) was born in Westwood House, Clayton Green.

Gallery

See also
Listed buildings in Clayton-le-Woods
Scheduled monuments in Lancashire

References

External links

Clayton-le-Woods chorley.gov.uk.
Parish council, etc

Geography of Chorley
Villages in Lancashire
Civil parishes in Lancashire